On the Thames is a late 19th-century oil painting by American artist Frank Myers Boggs. Done in oil on canvas, the work was one of numerous paintings of the River Thames produced by Boggs, who operated an art studio on the river's bank in London. The painting is currently in the collection of the Metropolitan Museum of Art.

References 

1883 paintings
Paintings in the collection of the Metropolitan Museum of Art